Fabrizio Galliari (1709–1790) was an Italian painter active in Northern Italy.

Biography
He was born in Andorno in the Piedmontese province of Biella, and died in Treviglio. He was part of a large family of artists, the second son of Giovanni, and brother of Bernardino Galliari. Fabrizio was a quadraturista. He painted in many churches and palaces. He painted the cupola of the Cathedral of Vercelli. In 1778, he became professor at the Albertina Academy. Bernardino was the first son of Giovanni.

References

1709 births
1790 deaths
18th-century Italian painters
Italian male painters
People from Andorno Micca
Academic staff of Accademia Albertina
18th-century Italian male artists